This is a list of all cyclists who competed at the 2012 Summer Olympics in London, United Kingdom. A total of 505 cyclists from 74 countries competed in the 18 cycling events in the disciplines: BMX, mountain biking, road cycling, and track cycling.

The Dutch Ellen van Dijk and the German Judith Arndt competed both on the track and on the road in 3 different events. In total six cyclists competed in two cycling disciplines and ten cyclists competed in three cycling events.

The youngest cyclist was Mathias Møller Nielsen from Denmark (18 years, 137 days), and the oldest cyclist was María Luisa Calle from Colombia (43 years, 308 days).

2012 Olympic cyclists

References

 
2012
Olympic, 2012
Cyclists, 2012}